Stuart Addition Historic District is a national historic district located at Staunton, Virginia. The district encompasses 93 contributing buildings in a primarily residential section of Staunton.  The district includes some early 19th-century structures, but most of the homes were built after 1870.  The medium-density residential area includes notable examples of the Colonial Revival, Italianate, and Gothic Revival styles.   Notable buildings include the Blakely or Templeton House (c. 1865, 1917), Steele House (1928), Kivlighan House (1910), Arlington Flats (c. 1890, c. 1905), D. Webster Davis School (1915), St. Francis of Assisi Catholic Church (1895), Augusta Street Methodist Church (1876, 1911), Ebenezer Baptist Church (1910), and Mt. Zion Baptist Church (1904).  Located in the district is the separately listed C. W. Miller House.

It was added to the National Register of Historic Places in 1984.

References

Historic districts on the National Register of Historic Places in Virginia
Colonial Revival architecture in Virginia
Italianate architecture in Virginia
Gothic Revival architecture in Virginia
Buildings and structures in Staunton, Virginia
National Register of Historic Places in Staunton, Virginia